The International Centre for Advanced Materials (ICAM) is a research partnership made up of the energy company, bp, and the four universities:The University of Manchester, The University of Cambridge, The University of Illinois at Urbana-Champaign, and Imperial College London. The ICAM is an experimental organisation, both in its research and partnership model, with the University of Manchester acting as the administrative hub, and the other universities acting as the spokes. The research undertaken is focused on improving the processes integral to the energy industry, in particular how advanced materials can be used to solve the challenges faced. Some notable research includes work on 3D simulation of viscoplastic fluids and fouling mitigation strategies for synthesised foulants.

Structure 
The organisation was founded in Autumn 2012 with a $100 million, 10 year investment from bp, with the aim of addressing some of challenges experienced by the energy sector. The research areas were initially split into five Enduring Themes: Corrosion and Degradation, Fouling and Deposition, Separations, Wear and Lubricants, and Materials systems. Another area, Underpinning Tools, supports each of these in turn. It was decided in 2020 to add another Enduring Theme to assist with bp's aim of becoming a net zero company by 2050 or sooner. The Low Carbon was announced in July 2020 with an open-call for projects among the ICAM spoke universities.

Notable members 

 Professor Sarah Haigh (director)
 Professor Sheetal Handa (associate director)
 Professor Vernon Gibson (executive director)
 Professor Allan Matthews (director 2016–2020)
 Professor Phillip J. Withers (director 2012–2016)
 Professor Nancy Sottos (board member)
 Professor Martin Schroder (board member)
 Professor Paul Braun (board member)
 Professor Paul Midgley (board member)

References 

Research projects
BP
University of Manchester
Organisations associated with the University of Cambridge
University of Illinois Urbana-Champaign
Organisations associated with Imperial College London
2012 establishments